Grevillea decora is a species of flowering plant in the family Proteaceae and is endemic to Queensland. It is an erect shrub or small tree with a single main stem, oblong, oval or egg-shaped leaves, and groups of pinkish red or pink flowers.

Description

Taxonomy
Grevillea decora was first formally described in 1921 by Karel Domin in the journal Bibliotheca Botanica from specimens he collected near Pentland in 1910. The specific epithet (decora) means "beautiful".

In 2000, Robert Owen Makinson described two subspecies in the Flora of Australia and the names are accepted by the Australian Plant Census:

Distribution and habitat
Subspecies decora grows in woodland shrubland in shallow soil over sandstone and occurs in patchy locations along the ranges of inland eastern Queensland from near Wandoan to near Pentland but subspecies telfordii grows in heath and forest near Laura in far north Queenland.

Conservation status
Both subspecies of G. decora are listed as of "least concern" under the Queensland Government Nature Conservation Act 1992.

See also
 List of Grevillea species

References

decora
Proteales of Australia
Flora of Queensland
Taxa named by Karel Domin
Plants described in 1921